Shunsui (written: 春水, 春翠 or 舜水) is a masculine Japanese given name. Notable people with the name include:

, Japanese benshi
, 18th-century Japanese painter and printmaker
, pen name of Sasaki Sadataka, Japanese writer
, Chinese scholar in Japan

Fictional characters
Shunsui Kyōraku, a character in the manga series Bleach

Japanese masculine given names